Mithridates III was the fourth king of Pontus, son of Mithridates II of Pontus and Laodice. Mithridates had two sisters: Laodice III, the first wife of the Seleucid King Antiochus III the Great, and Laodice of Pontus. He may have ruled in an uncertain period between 220 BC and 183 BC. Nothing is known of him since the years just cited, because the kingdom of Pontus disappears from history. His same existence is contested by certain historians, even if it is necessary to account for Appian's indication of Mithridates VI of Pontus as the eighth king of the dynasty and the sixth of the name. Mithridates married an obscure Seleucid princess called Laodice. By this wife, he had three children: Mithridates IV of Pontus, Pharnaces I of Pontus and Laodice.

References
Hazel, John. Who's Who in the Greek World. "Mithridates III", 2003.
M. Getzel, Hellenistic settlements in Europe, the islands and Asia Minor, Cohen University of California Press, 1995
J.D. Grainger, A Seleukid prosopography and gazetteer, BRILL 1997
The First Royal Coinage of Pontos (from Mithridates III to Mithridates V), Francois de Callatay

Notes

External links
Coinage of Mithridates III on pages 4-7

Mithridatic kings of Pontus
2nd-century BC rulers in Asia
Ancient Persian people
2nd-century BC Iranian people
3rd-century BC monarchs
Iranian people of Greek descent